Nikolai Sergeyevich Yegorov (5 January 1921 – 14 December 2021) was a Soviet and Russian microbiologist and politician. A member of the Communist Party, he served as Deputy Minister of Higher Education from 1967 to 1988.

References

1921 births
2021 deaths
People from Suzdalsky Uyezd
Communist Party of the Soviet Union members
Honoured Scientists of the Russian Federation
Recipients of the Medal of Zhukov
Recipients of the Order of Friendship of Peoples
Recipients of the Order of the Red Banner of Labour
Recipients of the USSR State Prize
Men centenarians
Russian centenarians

Russian microbiologists
Russian politicians